The 1983 Metro Conference men's basketball tournament was held March 10–12 at Riverfront Coliseum in Cincinnati, Ohio. 

Louisville defeated  in the championship game, 66–51, to win their fourth Metro men's basketball tournament.

The Cardinals received an automatic bid to the 1983 NCAA Tournament, and would go on to reach the Final Four. Memphis State received an at-large bid.

Format
All seven of the conference's members participated. They were seeded based on regular season conference records, with the top team earning a bye into the semifinal round. The other six teams entered into the preliminary first round.

This was the first tournament for Southern Miss, who joined the Metro Conference after playing as an Independent. They replaced Saint Louis, who departed for the Midwestern City Conference prior to the season.

Bracket

References

Metro Conference men's basketball tournament
Tournament
Metro Conference men's basketball tournament
Metro Conference men's basketball tournament